Victor Halansky, is a Russian economist. He was executive manager in Bureau of the State Bank of the USSR in Leningrad; 1990-1996 – Chief Officer, Main Department of the Central Bank of the Russian Federation in Saint Petersburg. Since 2003 - Director of Saint Petersburg Banking School (college) of the Bank of Russia. Since 2000 - Chairman of the Board of Directors of Viking Bank.

Education

Leningrad University of Engineering and Economics.
Science Degree in Economics, Professor of VAK (Higher Attestation Commission) at the Department of Currency Circulation and Credit (since 1995).
Academy of National Economy (1976).

Biography

Victor Halansky was born on 4 August 1937 in Shostka, a town in the Sumy Oblast. He graduated from the Economics Faculty at Shostka College of Chemistry and Technology in 1955, from the Machine-building Faculty at Saint Petersburg State University of Engineering and Economics in 1960. He has a Science degree in Economics and title of Professor. 1960-1978 - he worked his way up from a shop foreman to a Deputy General Director at the Industrial Association Power Machines ("Elektrosila"); 1966-1969 - a main economy and planning expert on the heavy engineering industry plant in Haridwar; 1978-1981 - Head of Machine-Building and Heavy Engineering Industry Department, the Planning Commission of Lengorispolkom; 1981-1985 - Deputy Head of Economy Department, Leningrad region commission of CPSU; 1985-1987 - Executive Manager, Bureau of the Gosbank in Leningrad; 1987-1988 - Chief Officer, Promstroybank USSR in Leningrad and Leningrad region; 1988-1990 - Deputy Chairman, Promstroybank USSR; 1990-1996 - Chief Officer, Main Department of the Central Bank of the Russian Federation in Saint Petersburg; 1996-1997 - Counsellor of the Central Bank of the Russian Federation, Main Department of the Central Bank of the Russian Federation in Saint Petersburg; since September, 1997 - First Deputy Chairman of the Management Board of Viking Bank.
Since 2000 - Chairman of the Board of Directors of Viking Bank. 
He was one of the organizers of the first five annual International Banking Congresses held in Saint Petersburg since 1992.
He is a full-fledged member of the St. Petersburg Engineering Academy, Russian Academy of the Investment and Construction Economics, Corresponding Member of the Academy of High School Sciences.

Author of more than 30 scientific works, learning and teaching materials in economics, finances and banking business. For a number of years he was engaged in teaching at St. Petersburg State University of Engineering and Economics, St. Petersburg State University of Economics and Finances, International Banking Institute.

Awards, honourable titles

Honoured Economist of Russian Federation.
Badge of Honour from the Bank of Russia “For Honourable Service in the Central Bank of the Russian Federation”

References

External links
 http://dic.academic.ru/dic.nsf/enc_biography/41624/%D0%A5%D0%B0%D0%BB%D0%B0%D0%BD%D1%81%D0%BA%D0%B8%D0%B9

1937 births
Living people
Russian economists
Russian bankers
Soviet bankers